Daniel Weiss (born 22 February 1990 in Titisee-Neustadt, West Germany) is a German professional ice hockey right wing who is currently playing with EC Bad Nauheim of the DEL2.

Playing career 
Weiss began playing in Germany's top-flight DEL in 2007 with Eisbären Berlin and was loaned to the Dresdner Eislöwen of the 2nd Bundesliga during the 2009–10 season. He has played internationally for Germany at the IIHF World U18 Championships and the World Juniors. During the 2012-13 season, Weiss went on loan to the Nürnberg IceTigers, before returning to Berlin.

On April 2, 2014, Weiss left Berlin and signed a two-year contract with fellow DEL club, the Augsburger Panther. On April 3, 2016, he inked a three-year deal with Düsseldorfer EG.

After two seasons with DEG, Weiss returned to the Thomas Sabo Ice Tigers, agreeing to a three-year deal on June 26, 2018.

During the 2022–23 season, while in the final season of his contract with the Bietigheim Steelers, Weiss contributed with 17 points through 42 games before opting to move to the DEL2 and join EC Bad Nauheim for the remainder of the season on 10 February 2023.

Career statistics

Regular season and playoffs

International

References

External links

1990 births
German ice hockey left wingers
Living people
Augsburger Panther players
SC Bietigheim-Bissingen players
Dresdner Eislöwen players
Düsseldorfer EG players
Eisbären Berlin players
ETC Crimmitschau players
Iserlohn Roosters players
Schwenninger Wild Wings players
Thomas Sabo Ice Tigers players